Cassola is a town in the province of Vicenza, Veneto, Italy. It is south of SP90.  As of 2007 Cassola had an estimated population of 13,997.

Cassola is the center where the town hall is located. However, the most populated center of the town is San Giuseppe, also known as Termine di Cassola. In the square of San Giuseppe di Cassola there is a municipal building where the town library and a detached municipal office are located.

Toponym 
According to the earliest sources available, the name Cassola derives from the union of the words "casa" and  "sola" ("house" and "alone"), as it would seem that there was only one house in the current town territory, a wooded area at that time.

Sources
(Google Maps)

Cities and towns in Veneto